Sir William Linton Andrews (27 May 1886 – 27 September 1972) was a British journalist and newspaper editor.

Early life 

Andrews was born in Kingston upon Hull on 27 May 1886. He was the son of William Andrews and Jeanie Leslie Andrews.  He was educated at Hull Grammar School.  He was married to Gertrude Douglas. He died on 27 September 1972, aged 86.

Career 

His first stint of journalism was for the Sheffield Telegraph.  He worked as a journalist for a number of local newspapers.  He became editor of the Leeds Mercury from 1923 until it merged with the Yorkshire Post in 1939. He then succeeded Arthur Mann as editor of the Yorkshire Post.

Distinctions 
Andrews was a president of the Guild of British Newspaper Editors. He was also a founder member of the Press Council, and served as its Chairman between 1955–1959.

Andrews was knighted in 1954.

References

External links
 

 

British journalists
People from Kingston upon Hull
1886 births
1972 deaths